The 2011–12 season was FK Vardar's 20th consecutive season in First League. This article shows player statistics and all official matches that the club was played during the 2011–12 season.

Before that season, the Vardar was spared from relegation because as it merged with Miravci. Vardar was won their sixth Macedonian championship, first after nine years.

Squad

As of 25 February 2012

Competitions

First League

League table

Results summary

Matches

Macedonian Football Cup

First round

Second round

Quarter-final

Semi-final

Statistics

Top scorers

References

FK Vardar seasons
Vardar